Peschanaya is a village in the Olkhonsky District of Irkutsk region of Russia, a part of the Khuzhirskiy municipal unit. Located in the bay Nurganskaya Guba in the middle part of the western coast of Olkhon Island, in 12 km northeast from the village Kharantsy.

In the late 1930s near the village a correctional labor camp was established for those convicted of hooliganism and larceny.
The camp was a part of the GULAG system, the barracks were fenced with barbed wire.
The prisoners worked on fishing boats, at the fish factory and a sawmill.

References

Rural localities in Irkutsk Oblast
Camps of the Gulag
Populated places on Lake Baikal
Olkhon Island